Yuxian may refer to:

Yuxian (Qing dynasty) (1842–1901), Manchu high official of the Qing dynasty
Yu County, Hebei (蔚县), or Yuxian, county in Hubei, China
Yu County, Shanxi (盂县), or Yuxian, county in Shanxi, China
Yuzhou, Henan, formerly Yu County (禹县) or Yuxian, county-level city in Henan, China